Fairy Falls is a 20-foot waterfall on the Oregon side of the Columbia River Gorge in the United States. As part of a tributary of Wahkeena Creek, Fairy Falls is located upstream from the much larger Wahkeena Falls. While small, this fan-shaped waterfall is a destination for photographers, mainly because of the scenic view. The creek cascades through a mossy rock slide lined with ferns, until rocky ledges of basalt break the water into various lacy streams.

References

 

Waterfalls of Oregon
Columbia River Gorge
Waterfalls of Multnomah County, Oregon
Mount Hood National Forest
Fan waterfalls